Cryptocercus is a genus of Dictyoptera (cockroaches and allies) and the sole member of its own family Cryptocercidae. Species are known as wood roaches or brown-hooded cockroaches. These roaches are subsocial, their young requiring considerable parental interaction. They also share wood-digesting gut bacteria types with wood-eating termites, and are therefore seen as evidence of a close genetic relationship, that termites are essentially evolved from social cockroaches.

Cryptocercus is especially notable for sharing numerous characteristics with termites, and phylogenetic studies have shown this genus is more closely related to termites than it is to other cockroaches.

Species
Found in North America and (especially temperate) Asia, there are 12 known species:
 Cryptocercus clevelandi Byers, 1997
 Cryptocercus darwini Burnside, Smith, Kambhampati, 1999
 Cryptocercus garciai Burnside, Smith, Kambhampati, 1999
 Cryptocercus hirtus Grandcolas, Bellés, 2005
 Cryptocercus kyebangensis Grandcolas, 2001
 Cryptocercus matilei Grandcolas, 2000
 Cryptocercus meridianus Grandcolas, Legendre, 2005
 Cryptocercus parvus Grandcolas, Park, 2005
 Cryptocercus primarius Bey-Bienko, 1938
 Cryptocercus punctulatus Scudder, 1862
 Cryptocercus relictus Bey-Bienko, 1935
 Cryptocercus wrighti Burnside, Smith, Kambhampati, 1999

References

Further reading
Nalepa, C.A., Byers, G.W., Bandi, C. and Sironi, M. 1997. "Description of Cryptocercus clevelandi (Dictyoptera: Cryptocercidae) from the Northwestern United States, molecular analysis of bacterial symbionts in its fat body, and notes on biology, distribution and biogeography."  Annals of the Entomological Society of America. 90:416-424. 
Burnside, C.A., P.T. Smith and S. Kambhampati, 1999. "Three New Species of the Wood Roach, Cryptocercus (Blattodea: Cryptocercidae), from the Eastern United States." The World Wide Web Journal of Biology 4:1

Cockroach genera